The Marbella Cup is an annual friendly football tournament held in Spain during the winter football break. The tournament takes place in Marbella, Andalusia. It mainly involves football teams from Brazil, Germany, Romania, Russia, Sweden, Ukraine, and Italy

Prize money 
In 2012 the winning team's prize money was 12,000 euros. Other prizes of 6,000, 3,500 and 2,500 euros were payable for earlier rounds.

Winners

References

External links

Footballimpact
Scorespro 2010-2011
Scorespro 2011-2012
Scorespro 2012-2013
Sportline
Oddsportal 2011
Oddsportal 2012